Streptomyces chartreusis is a bacterium species from the genus of Streptomyces which has been isolated from soil in Africa. Streptomyces chartreusis produces N-deacyltunicamycin, elsamicin A, aminoacylase and chartreusin.

Further reading

See also 
 List of Streptomyces species

References

External links
Type strain of Streptomyces chartreusis at BacDive -  the Bacterial Diversity Metadatabase

chartreusis
Bacteria described in 1953